The South Australian Railways Q Class were steam locomotives constructed between 1885 and 1892 by Dübs and Company and James Martin & Co for the South Australian Railways (SAR).

History
The first batch of fifteen Q Class locomotives were purchased from Dübs and Company, Scotland to replace the unsuccessful N and O class locomotives on the South Australian Railways "Intercolonial" hills line workings. With the new Q class locomotives being able to haul moderate loads on offer, these locomotives performed very well and the SAR ordered a second batch from the local James Martin & Co. Following the introduction of the more powerful R class locomotives on the southern line, the Q class was put to work on interstate trains from Murray Bridge to Serviceton as well as the northern lines.

They were often seen "double heading" with the S class locomotives on express passenger trains. Q class locomotive No. 90 worked local trains between Murray Bridge and Tailem Bend, and in its final three years of life it spent its time as shunting locomotive at the Islington Railway Workshops.

References

Dübs locomotives
South Australian Railways steam locomotives
Broad gauge locomotives in Australia